Below is a list of the 26 members of the European Parliament for the Netherlands in the 2014 to 2019 session.

Party representation

Mutations

2014
 22 May: Election for the European Parliament in the Netherlands.
 11 June: The Party for the Animals joins the European United Left–Nordic Green Left group.
 16 June: The Reformed Political Party leaves the Europe of Freedom and Democracy group and joins the European Conservatives and Reformists group.
 26 June: The election committee elects Hans Jansen for the empty seat of Geert Wilders in the European Parliament, because Geert Wilders did not accept the seat. He has 10 days to accept or reject.
 1 July: Beginning of the 8th European Parliament session. (2014–2019)
 1 July: Hans Jansen is installed in the European Parliament as a replacement for Geert Wilders of the Party for Freedom. Geert Wilders never entered as an MEP.

2015
 5 May: Hans Jansen of the Party for Freedom dies at 72 years.
 2 June: The election committee elects Geert Wilders for the empty seat of Hans Jansen in the European Parliament. He has 28 days to accept or reject.
 15 June: The Party for Freedom founds and joins the Europe of Nations and Freedom group.
 23 July: The election committee elects Auke Zijlstra for the empty seat of Hans Jansen in the European Parliament, because Geert Wilders did not accept the seat. He has 28 days to accept or reject.
 1 September: Auke Zijlstra is installed in the European Parliament as a replacement for Hans Jansen. Auke Zijlstra was the first inline after Geert Wilders did not accept his seat (based on preference votes and list order).
 8 September: Auke Zijlstra joins the Europe of Nations and Freedom group.

2017
 15 March: Vicky Maeijer of the Party for Freedom leaves the European Parliament to take her seat in the Dutch Parliament after the 2017 Dutch general election.
 23 May: The election committee elects Geert Wilders for the empty seat of Vicky Maeijer in the European Parliament. He has 28 days to accept or reject.
 2 June: The election committee elects André Elissen for the empty seat of Vicky Maeijer in the European Parliament, because Geert Wilders did not accept the seat. He has 28 days to accept or reject.
 13 June: André Elissen is installed in the European Parliament as a replacement for Vicky Maeijer of the Party for Freedom.
 25 October: Cora Nieuwenhuizen-Wijbenga left the European Parliament to become the Minister of Infrastructure and Water Management in the Netherlands
 7 November: The election committee elects Caroline Nagtegaal-van Doorn for the empty seat of Cora Nieuwenhuizen-Wijbenga in the European Parliament. She has 28 days to accept or reject.
 14 November: Caroline Nagtegaal-van Doorn is installed in the European Parliament as a replacement for Cora Nieuwenhuizen-Wijbenga of the People's Party for Freedom and Democracy.

List

By name

| style="text-align:left;" colspan="11" | 
|-
! Name
! Sex
! National party
! EP Group
! Period
! Preference vote
|-
| style="text-align:left;" | Hans van Baalen
| style="text-align:left;" | Male
| style="text-align:left;" |  People's Party for Freedom and Democracy
| style="text-align:left;" |  ALDE
| style="text-align:left;" | 14 July 2009 – 2 July 2019
| style="text-align:left;" | 358,029
|-
| style="text-align:left;" | Bas Belder
| style="text-align:left;" | Male
| style="text-align:left;" |  Reformed Political Party
| style="text-align:left;" |  ECR
| style="text-align:left;" | 20 July 1999 – 2 July 2019
| style="text-align:left;" | 53,995
|-
| style="text-align:left;" | Wim van de Camp
| style="text-align:left;" | Male
| style="text-align:left;" |  Christian Democratic Appeal
| style="text-align:left;" |  EPP
| style="text-align:left;" | 14 July 2009 – 2 July 2019
| style="text-align:left;" | 37,715
|-
| style="text-align:left;" | Peter van Dalen
| style="text-align:left;" | Male
| style="text-align:left;" |  Christian Union
| style="text-align:left;" |  ECR
| style="text-align:left;" | 14 July 2009 – Present
| style="text-align:left;" | 253,620
|-
| style="text-align:left;" | Bas Eickhout
| style="text-align:left;" | Male
| style="text-align:left;" |  GreenLeft
| style="text-align:left;" |  G–EFA
| style="text-align:left;" | 14 July 2009 – Present
| style="text-align:left;" | 184,154
|-
| style="text-align:left;" | André Elissen
| style="text-align:left;" | Male
| style="text-align:left;" |  Party for Freedom
| style="text-align:left;" |  ENF
| style="text-align:left;" | 13 June 2017 – 2 July 2019
| style="text-align:left;" | 1,976
|-
| style="text-align:left;" | Gerben-Jan Gerbrandy
| style="text-align:left;" | Male
| style="text-align:left;" |  Democrats 66
| style="text-align:left;" |  ALDE
| style="text-align:left;" | 14 July 2009 – 2 July 2019
| style="text-align:left;" | 31,326
|-
| style="text-align:left;" | Marcel de Graaff
| style="text-align:left;" | Male
| style="text-align:left;" |  Party for Freedom
| style="text-align:left;" |  NI /  ENF
| style="text-align:left;" | 1 July 2014 – 2 July 2019
| style="text-align:left;" | 276,680
|-
| style="text-align:left;" | Anja Hazekamp
| style="text-align:left;" | Female
| style="text-align:left;" |  Party for the Animals
| style="text-align:left;" |  EUL–NGL
| style="text-align:left;" | 1 July 2014 – Present
| style="text-align:left;" | 131,093
|-
| style="text-align:left;" | Jan Huitema
| style="text-align:left;" | Male
| style="text-align:left;" |  People's Party for Freedom and Democracy
| style="text-align:left;" |  ALDE
| style="text-align:left;" | 1 July 2014 – 2 July 2019
| style="text-align:left;" | 26,031
|-
| style="text-align:left;" | Hans Jansen
| style="text-align:left;" | Male
| style="text-align:left;" |  Party for Freedom
| style="text-align:left;" |  NI /  ENF
| style="text-align:left;" | 1 July 2014 – 5 May 2015
| style="text-align:left;" | 16,568
|-
| style="text-align:left;" | Dennis de Jong
| style="text-align:left;" | Male
| style="text-align:left;" |  Socialist Party
| style="text-align:left;" |  EUL–NGL
| style="text-align:left;" | 14 July 2009 – 2 July 2019
| style="text-align:left;" | 300,782
|-
| style="text-align:left;" | Agnes Jongerius
| style="text-align:left;" | Female
| style="text-align:left;" |  Labour Party
| style="text-align:left;" |  S&D
| style="text-align:left;" | 1 July 2014 – Present
| style="text-align:left;" | 170,119
|-
| style="text-align:left;" | Esther de Lange
| style="text-align:left;" | Female
| style="text-align:left;" |  Christian Democratic Appeal
| style="text-align:left;" |  EPP
| style="text-align:left;" | 12 April 2007 – Present
| style="text-align:left;" | 415,011
|-
| style="text-align:left;" | Jeroen Lenaers
| style="text-align:left;" | Male
| style="text-align:left;" |  Christian Democratic Appeal
| style="text-align:left;" |  EPP
| style="text-align:left;" | 1 July 2014 – Present
| style="text-align:left;" | 36,428
|-
| style="text-align:left;" | Vicky Maeijer
| style="text-align:left;" | Female
| style="text-align:left;" |  Party for Freedom
| style="text-align:left;" |  NI /  ENF
| style="text-align:left;" | 1 July 2014 – 15 March 2017
| style="text-align:left;" | 26,491
|-
| style="text-align:left;" | Matthijs van Miltenburg
| style="text-align:left;" | Male
| style="text-align:left;" |  Democrats 66
| style="text-align:left;" |  ALDE
| style="text-align:left;" | 1 July 2014 – 2 July 2019
| style="text-align:left;" | 16,698
|-
| style="text-align:left;" | Anne-Marie Mineur
| style="text-align:left;" | Female
| style="text-align:left;" |  Socialist Party
| style="text-align:left;" |  EUL–NGL
| style="text-align:left;" | 1 July 2014 – 2 July 2019
| style="text-align:left;" | 52,187
|-
| style="text-align:left;" | Caroline Nagtegaal-van Doorn
| style="text-align:left;" | Female
| style="text-align:left;" |  People's Party for Freedom and Democracy
| style="text-align:left;" |  ALDE
| style="text-align:left;" | 14 November 2017 – Present
| style="text-align:left;" | 19,370
|-
| style="text-align:left;" | Cora van Nieuwenhuizen
| style="text-align:left;" | Female
| style="text-align:left;" |  People's Party for Freedom and Democracy
| style="text-align:left;" |  ALDE
| style="text-align:left;" | 1 July 2014 – 25 October 2017
| style="text-align:left;" | 86,237
|-
| style="text-align:left;" | Lambert van Nistelrooij
| style="text-align:left;" | Male
| style="text-align:left;" |  Christian Democratic Appeal
| style="text-align:left;" |  EPP
| style="text-align:left;" | 20 July 2004 – 2 July 2019
| style="text-align:left;" | 32,970
|-
| style="text-align:left;" | Kati Piri
| style="text-align:left;" | Female
| style="text-align:left;" |  Labour Party
| style="text-align:left;" |  S&D
| style="text-align:left;" | 1 July 2014 – Present
| style="text-align:left;" | 10,351
|-
| style="text-align:left;" | Judith Sargentini
| style="text-align:left;" | Female
| style="text-align:left;" |  GreenLeft
| style="text-align:left;" |  G–EFA
| style="text-align:left;" | 14 July 2009 – 2 July 2019
| style="text-align:left;" | 91,745
|-
| style="text-align:left;" | Marietje Schaake
| style="text-align:left;" | Female
| style="text-align:left;" |  Democrats 66
| style="text-align:left;" |  ALDE
| style="text-align:left;" | 14 July 2009 – 2 July 2019
| style="text-align:left;" | 41,236
|-
| style="text-align:left;" | Annie Schreijer-Pierik
| style="text-align:left;" | Female
| style="text-align:left;" |  Christian Democratic Appeal
| style="text-align:left;" |  EPP
| style="text-align:left;" | 1 July 2014 – Present
| style="text-align:left;" | 113,123
|-
| style="text-align:left;" | Olaf Stuger
| style="text-align:left;" | Male
| style="text-align:left;" |  Party for Freedom
| style="text-align:left;" |  NI /  ENF
| style="text-align:left;" | 1 July 2014 – 2 July 2019
| style="text-align:left;" | 4,021
|-
| style="text-align:left;" | Paul Tang
| style="text-align:left;" | Male
| style="text-align:left;" |  Labour Party
| style="text-align:left;" |  S&D
| style="text-align:left;" | 1 July 2014 – Present
| style="text-align:left;" | 183,296
|-
| style="text-align:left;" | Sophie in 't Veld
| style="text-align:left;" | Female
| style="text-align:left;" |  Democrats 66
| style="text-align:left;" |  ALDE
| style="text-align:left;" | 20 July 2004 – Present
| style="text-align:left;" | 568,185
|-
| style="text-align:left;" | Auke Zijlstra
| style="text-align:left;" | Male
| style="text-align:left;" |  Party for Freedom
| style="text-align:left;" |  NI /  ENF
| style="text-align:left;" | 13 September 2011 – 1 July 2014  7 September 2015 – 2 July 2019
| style="text-align:left;" | 4,509
|-
|-style="background-color:#dcdcdc"
| style="text-align:left;" colspan="6" |Source:
|-
|}

By party

On the Democrats 66 list: (ALDE)

 Sophie in 't Veld (top candidate)
 Marietje Schaake
 Gerben-Jan Gerbrandy
 Matthijs van Miltenburg

On the Christian Democratic Appeal list: (EPP Group)

 Esther de Lange (top candidate)
 Annie Schreijer-Pierik
 Wim van de Camp
 Jeroen Lenaers
 Lambert van Nistelrooij

On the Party for Freedom list: (Non-inscrits, since 15 June 2015 ENF)

 Marcel de Graaff (top candidate)
 Vicky Maeijer (left the European Parliament on 15 March 2017. Replaced by: André Elissen)
 Olaf Stuger
 Hans Jansen (died at 72) (replaced by: Auke Zijlstra)

On the People’s Party for Freedom and Democracy list: (ALDE)

 Hans van Baalen (top candidate)
 Cora van Nieuwenhuizen (left the European Parliament on 25 October 2017. Replaced by: Caroline Nagtegaal-van Doorn)
 Jan Huitema

On the Labour Party list: (S&D)

 Paul Tang (top candidate)
 Agnes Jongerius
 Kati Piri

On the Socialist Party list: (GUE/NGL Group)

 Dennis de Jong (top candidate)
 Anne-Marie Mineur

On the Christian Union – Reformed Political Party list: (ECR Group)

 Peter van Dalen (Christian Union) (top candidate)
 Bas Belder (SGP)

On the GroenLinks list: (Greens-EFA)

 Bas Eickhout (top candidate)
 Judith Sargentini

On the Party for the Animals list: (GUE/NGL Group)

 Anja Hazekamp (top candidate)

References 

2014
Netherlands
List